Asteropeia labatii is a species of plant in the Asteropeiaceae family. It is endemic to Madagascar.  Its natural habitat is subtropical or tropical high-altitude shrubland. It is threatened by habitat loss.

References

Endemic flora of Madagascar
labatii
Endangered plants
Taxonomy articles created by Polbot